As with many television shows, Ghostwriter (4 October 1992 to 13 February 1995) also produced several book stories that never made it to air. This article lists all books based on the show.

The Ghostwriter Detective Guide 1 October 1992 by Susan Lurie
A Match of Wills 1 October 1992 by Eric Weiner
Courting Danger and Other Stories November 1992 by Dina Anastasio
Dress Code Mess 1 October 1992 by Sarah St. Antoine
The Mini Book of Kids' Puzzles
The Big Book of Kids' Puzzles
Off the Top of Your Head: Trivia, Facts, and Fun
Steer Clear of Haunted Hill
The Team: On and Off the Set
Amazement Park Adventure
Alias Diamond Jones
Doubletalk: Codes, Signs, and Symbols
Rally! A Year's Supply of Fun
Blackout!
A Blast With the Past
Digging For Clues
Disappearing Act
Word Up!
Write Now! A Postcard Book
The Book Chase
Go Figure: Puzzles, Games, and Funny Figures of Speech
Clinton Street Crime Wave
Read This Rebus!
Ghost Story
What's the Score? A Sports Puzzle Book
The Big Stink and Five Other Mysteries
Laugh Rally! A Ghostwriter Joke Book
The Chocolate Bar Bust
School's Out! Puzzles That Take You Cool Places
Daycamp Nightmare: Camp at Your Own Risk #1
Disaster On Wheels: Camp at Your Own Risk #2
Creepy Sleepaway: Camp at Your Own Risk #3
Night of the Living Cavemen
The Haunted House of Puzzles
A Crime of Two Cities
Movie Marvels: Film Facts You'll Flip For
Just in Time
The Ghostwriter Detective Guide 2
Deadline
Cow-Eating Fish and Other Amazing Animals
Attack of the Slime Monster
The Man Who Vanished
Alien Alert
Caught in the Net
Hector's Haunted House

References

Series of children's books
Ghostwriter (TV series)
Books based on television series